The Day of the State Flag of Tajikistan is an official holiday of Tajikistan. It was established in 2009 and is celebrated on November 24. It celebrates the adoption of the Flag of Tajikistan on November 24, 1992.

Commemorations 
On this occasion, various cultural activities are held across the entire country, with residents often hoisting the national flag over their houses.

See also 
 Public holidays in Tajikistan

References 

Events in Tajikistan
Observances in Tajikistan
Public holidays in Tajikistan
Tajikistani culture